Kuku Mey Mey is an Indian flash-animated slapstick comedy television series produced by HopMotion Animation. It premiered on Toon Goggles and Amazon Prime Video simultaneously under the title Kuku and the Goat.

Synopsis
Mey Mey lives in an inn in a jungle. Kuku, tries to break into the inn but Mey Mey has set up traps to dissuade Kuku.

Characters
Kuku: Kuku always tries to get into Mey Mey's inn. Despite being a lion, he is not violent.
Mey Mey: Mey Mey is a goat who lives an inn in a forest. When Kuku tries to get in, he sets up traps.

Reception
It was nominated for FICCI's Best Animated Frames award in the Episode (Indian) category.

References

2018 Indian television series debuts
Indian flash animated television series
Indian children's animated comedy television series
Animated television series about lions
Fiction about goats
Animated television series about mammals
Television shows set in Africa
Animated television series without speech